Robert Wastell (fl. 1406–1410) of Totnes, Devon, was an English politician.

He was a Member (MP) of the Parliament of England for Totnes in 1406 and 1410.

References

Year of birth missing
Year of death missing
English MPs 1406
People from Totnes
English MPs 1410
Members of the Parliament of England (pre-1707) for Totnes